Greye La Spina (July 10, 1880 – September 17, 1969) was an American writer who published more than one hundred short stories, serials, novelettes, and one-act plays. Her stories appeared in Metropolitan, Black Mask, Action Stories, Ten-Story Book, The Thrill Book, Weird Tales, Modern Marriage, Top-Notch Magazine, All-Story, Photoplay, and many other magazines.

Biography 
La Spina was born Fanny Greye Bragg on July 10, 1880, in Wakefield, Massachusetts.  Her father was a Methodist clergyman.  She was married to Ralph Geissler in 1898 and gave birth to a daughter, Celia, two years later.  The following year, her husband died.  In 1910 she married Baron Robert La Spina, an Italian aristocrat.

Her first supernatural story, "The Wolf on the Steppes" was sold to Thrill Book in 1919.  She won second place in Photoplay magazine's 1921 short story contest gaining her a $2,500 prize.

Her first and only hardcover book, the novel, Invaders from the Dark, was published by Arkham House in 1960.

Selected short stories
"The Ultimate Ingredient" (Thrill Book, 1919)
"A Seat on the Platform" (Photoplay, April 1921)
"The Tortoise-Shell Cat" (Weird Tales, November 1924)
"The Scarf of the Beloved" (Weird Tales, February 1925)
"The Gargoyle" (Weird Tales, September - November 1925)
"The Devil's Pool" (Weird Tales, June 1932)
"The Sinister Painting" (Weird Tales, September 1934)
"Death Has Red Hair" (Weird Tales, September 1942)
"Great Pan Is Here" (Weird Tales, November 1943)
"The Antimacassar" (Weird Tales, May 1949)
"Old Mr. Wiley" (Weird Tales, March 1951)

References
 Barrett, Mike. "Weaver of Weird Tales: Greye La Spina" in his Doors to Elsewhere. Cheadle, Staffordshire, UK: Alchemy Press, 2013, pp. 45–61.

External links

 
 
 

1880 births
1969 deaths
American fantasy writers
American horror writers
American women short story writers
People from Wakefield, Massachusetts
Pseudonymous women writers
Novelists from Massachusetts
American women dramatists and playwrights
Women science fiction and fantasy writers
Women horror writers
American women novelists
20th-century American novelists
20th-century American dramatists and playwrights
20th-century American women writers
20th-century American short story writers
20th-century pseudonymous writers